Paul Andrew Young (born 28 July 1973) is an English chocolatier, pâtissier and television personality.

Early life and education
Young was born in Barnsley, South Yorkshire, Young's parents divorced when he was 18 months old, and as a result he and his brother were raised by their mother in Trimdon Station, County Durham. He attended Wellfield Community School until the age of 15, when he left to attended New College Durham in order to study hotel catering and management. Upon completing his foundation course at New College, Young subsequently attended Leeds Metropolitan University. 

Young relocated to London after leaving university and worked as Head Pastry Chef under Marco Pierre White at The Criterion Brassiere and Quo Vadis. Young then left Quo Vadis to work as a Product Developer for Marks & Spencer and Sainsbury's, before founding his own company, Paul A. Young Fine Chocolates Ltd, with business partner James Cronin in 2004.

Work
Paul A. Young Fine Chocolates opened their first chocolaterie, in Camden Passage, Islington, in 2006. A second shop would open the following year in The Royal Exchange, and a third on Soho's Wardour Street would follow in June, 2011. The Royal Exchange store closed  August 2019 due to rent increases.

Young launched his first chocolate cookbook entitled Adventures with Chocolate in 2012 via Kyle Books. His second book Sensational Chocolate was released in 2016 via Clearwater Publishing. The book featured recipes from 50 celebrities including Emma Thompson and Nigella Lawson, and all profits went to the Children's Air Ambulance, of which Young was an Ambassador.

Young has appeared on a variety of cookery shows including Saturday Kitchen and This Morning, typically sharing different chocolate recipes or acting as an expert/judge.

In 2019, Young controversially used the divisive flavour of the Durian fruit (popular in Southeast Asia) in a campaign to draw attention to Domestic Violence on behalf of Woman’s Trust. He subsequently apologised for any offence he may have inadvertently caused towards the Southeast Asian community.

Personal life
Young lives with his partner Luke. In addition to serving as an Ambassador to the Children's Air Ambulance, Young also served as Vice-President of The Sick Children's Trust.

Filmography

Television

Bibliography
 Adventures with Chocolate (2012)  
 Sensational Chocolate (2016)

References

External links
 Paul A Young Fine Chocolates

Chocolatiers
1973 births
Living people
English chefs
English television chefs
People from Barnsley